Adventures of Pow Wow is an American animated cartoon that was broadcast on the Captain Kangaroo show during the 1950s. The series is in the public domain due to failure to renew copyright.

Plot
The cartoon features the pre-adolescent Native American boy Pow Wow, as well as the tribe's medicine man, and a Native American girl who is a friend of Pow Wow's. The cartoons often center on Pow Wow's discovery of an animal, hurt or otherwise, and his attempts to protect the forest and wildlife from various threats. When Pow Wow needs help in these missions, he seeks counsel from the wise medicine man.

Broadcast history
The cartoon first aired during the children's show Captain Kangaroo in 1956 and was syndicated by Screen Gems. It continued on Captain Kangaroo as a series of five-minute episodes until 1958. The cartoons were then once again syndicated and appeared locally in New York and Chicago.

Episodes

References

External links

Pow Wow the Indian Boy at Don Markstein's Toonopedia. Archived from the original on September 4, 2015.
Adventures of Pow Wow at Toon Tracker. Archived from the original on July 11, 2001.
 (title sic)
 
Pow Wow in The Magic Spigot

1950s American animated television series
1956 American television series debuts
1958 American television series endings
American children's animated adventure television series
Animated television series about children
English-language television shows